Ivan Kirillovich Elmanov was a Russian inventor. During 1820 in Myachkovo, near Moscow, he built a type of monorail described as a road on pillars. The single rail was made of timber balks resting above the pillars. The wheels were set on this wooden rail, while the horse-drawn carriage had a sled on its top. This construction is considered to be the first known monorail in the world.

See also 
 Henry Robinson Palmer
 List of Russian inventors

References

External links
The Unknown Russian Monorail

Russian inventors
Year of birth missing
Year of death missing